Cnephasia alticolana is a moth of the  family Tortricidae. It is found in Siberia and most of Europe (with the exception of Great Britain, Ireland, the Benelux, Norway and extreme south-eastern Europe).

The wingspan is 16–22 mm. The moth flies from May to the end of August.

The larvae feed on Bellis, Crepis, Hieracium, Plantago, Primula, Rumex, Taraxacum and Urtica species.

alticolana
Moths described in 1851
Moths of Europe